La Chambre obscure (English title: The Dark Room) is a 2000 French drama film directed and written by Marie-Christine Questerbert.

Cast

Caroline Ducey as  Aliénor 
Melvil Poupaud as  Bertrand 
Mathieu Demy as  Thomas 
Sylvie Testud as  Azalaïs 
Jackie Berroyer as  The king 
Hugues Quester as  Ambrogio 
Alice Houri as  Lisotta 
Pierre Baillot as  Maître Gérard de Narbonne 
Dimitri Rataud as  Marc 
Christian Cloarec as  Guillaume 
Édith Scob as  The widow 
Luis Rego as  The confessor
Thibault de Montalembert

External links

French drama films
2000 films
2000s French films